Markazi Rural District is in the Central District of Dashti County, Bushehr province, Iran. At the census of 2006, its population was 5,331 in 1,203 households; there were 5,784 inhabitants in 1,526 households at the following census of 2011; and in the most recent census of 2016, the population of the rural district was 6,354 in 1,800 households. The largest of its 13 villages was Mohammadabad, with 2,547 people.

References 

Rural Districts of Bushehr Province
Populated places in Dashti County